Paramjit Singh Pamma is an alleged Khalistani nationalist from the state of Punjab, India. He is a member of the  Khalistan Tiger Force and is on the NIA Most Wanted list.

Early life
Pamma a resident of SAS Nagar district, Punjab and engaged in low level crimes until 1992. He left India in 1994 and visited Pakistan  and started fundraising for the  Babbar Khalsa International, a Khalistani organisation.

Pamma was initially, close to Wadhawa Singh chief of Babbar Khalsa. Later on, Pamma joined the Khalistan Tiger Force and became closer to its chief Jagtar Singh Tara. Pamma then took charge of the terrorist-related activities in Thailand. He also provided support and infrastructure to  terrorists from Punjab in South-East Asia.

Pamma had taken political asylum in United Kingdom in the year 2000 and lived in UK with his family.

Alleged crimes committed
Patiala and Ambala bomb explosions in Punjab, India.
Head of Rashtriya Sikh Sangat, Rulda Singh’s killing in 2009.

Arrest and extradition
An Interpol Red Corner notice against Pamma was active which helped in his arrest at Portugal.

Pamma was arrested on 18 December 2015 by the Portuguese police on a red corner alert issued on the request of the Indian Government. He was released by Portugal after Portugal turned down the extradition request by India.

Affiliations
Babbar Khalsa International 
Khalistan Tiger Force

External links
 WANTED BY INTERPOL, NEW DELHI

References

Sikh politics
People from Sahibzada Ajit Singh Nagar district
Khalistan movement
Sikh terrorism
Living people
Year of birth missing (living people)